Blu DeTiger (born February 22, 1998) is an American singer-songwriter, bass guitar player, record producer, and DJ based in New York City.

Early life
DeTiger was born in New York City and grew up in NoHo, Manhattan. Her older brother suggested the name 'Blu' when she was born and her parents went along with it; her surname comes from her Dutch father, who is a visual artist. She started playing bass guitar at 7 years old, inspired by her brother Rex, who played drums, and she was enrolled in School of Rock from age 7 to 13. Through that program, she played at CBGB at age 7. Until she was 14 years old, her family spent summers in Ibiza, which exposed her to DJs and house music. She was also influenced by funk music and disco music and, when she was 13 or 14, she learned slapping. Throughout middle school and high school, DeTiger played in bands with kids generally older than her.

DeTiger attended New York University Tisch School of the Arts for two and a half years, including a year at the Clive Davis Institute of Recorded Music, before dropping out to tour and promote her music. She was mentored by Steven Wolf. As a student, she DJ'd at clubs in Manhattan, playing disco, house and funk where she would simultaneously improvise playing bass lines over the songs.

Career
Along with her brother, in 2018, DeTiger was a touring member of Kitten on their tour with Blue October.

DeTiger released her debut single "In My Head" on January 23, 2019. It was produced by The Knocks, and she subsequently toured with them. In 2019 and early 2020, DeTiger toured as a bassist with Caroline Polachek and FLETCHER. During the COVID-19 lockdowns, she posted her bass cover versions of songs by Prince, Janet Jackson, Russ, and Megan Thee Stallion on TikTok, which went viral.

Her debut EP How Did We Get Here? was released on March 5, 2021 on ALT:Vision records, with production help from her brother. She contributed bass to the Bleachers single "Stop Making This Hurt", released in May 2021.

She was featured on one of four covers of the August 2021 issue of Bass Player, which described her as the “future of bass”. That month, her song "Go Bad" was released on the soundtrack for the Netflix film He's All That. In September 2021, Fender collaborated with DeTiger to launch a new line of bass guitars for the Fender Player Plus series and named her an official Fender Next Player. The following month, DeTiger signed with Capitol Records. She subsequently released her debut "Blondes" with Capitol.

On January 15, 2022, DeTiger made her national TV debut on Saturday Night Live, accompanying Bleachers on bass. She featured in the 2022 film Olivia Rodrigo: Driving Home 2 U that March. During the summer of 2022, DeTiger headlined a European tour and performed at festivals such as Bonnaroo, Electric Forest, Lightning in a Bottle, Hangout, and the Governors Ball. She began an extensive North American tour in November 2022. DeTiger was listed in the music category for the 2023 edition of Forbes 30 Under 30.

Discography

EP

Singles

Filmography

References

1998 births
Living people
American bass guitarists
American DJs
21st-century American singers
21st-century American bass guitarists
21st-century American women musicians
Women bass guitarists
Singers from New York City
Tisch School of the Arts alumni